Madame Butterfly: A Tragedy of Japan is a play in one act by David Belasco adapted from John Luther Long's 1898 short story "Madame Butterfly". It premiered on March 5, 1900, at the Herald Square Theatre in New York City and became one of Belasco's most famous works. The play and Long's short story served as the basis for the libretto of Puccini's 1904 opera, Madama Butterfly. The title role was originally played in New York and London by Blanche Bates; in 1900–01 in New York by Valerie Bergere; and in 1913 by Clara Blandick.

Production

Madame Butterfly was first performed March 5, 1900, at the Herald Square Theatre in New York City, after the curtain raiser Naughty Anthony. The play was written and produced by David Belasco, with scenic design by Ernest Gros; incidental music was composed by William Furst.

Cast
 Blanche Bates as Cho-Cho-San
 Claude Gillingwater as Mr. Sharpless
 Frank Worthing as Lieut. B. F. Pinkerton
 Albert Bruning as Yamadori.
 E. P. Wilks as Nakado
 Mary Barker as Suzuki
 Katharine Black as Kate
 Little Kittle as "Trouble"

See also
Portrayal of Asians in American theater

Further reading
Clapp, John Bouvé and Edgett, Edwin Francis (1902). Plays of the Present. Dunlap Society, pp. 165–167
Girardi, Michele (2002). Puccini: His International Art. University of Chicago Press.     
Kerr, Douglas (1991). "David Henry Hwang and the Revenge of Madame Butterfly" in Asian Voices in English, Roy Harris (ed.). Hong Kong University Press, pp. 119–130. 
van Rij, Jan (2001). Madame Butterfly: Japonisme, Puccini, & the Search for the Real Cho-Cho-San. Stone Bridge Press.

References

External links 

Full text of Madame Butterfly, A Tragedy of Japan (from "Six Plays" Little, Brown 1928)
The stories of Madame Butterfly, a comparison of Long's short story, Belasco's play, and Puccini's opera.
Madame Butterfly - catalog record for the incidental music used for the play (part of the Belasco Collection in the Music Division of the New York Public Library for the Performing Arts).

Plays by David Belasco
Plays based on short fiction
1900 plays
Japan in fiction
One-act plays
Japan in non-Japanese culture